John Hewett may refer to:

John Hewett (chaplain) (1614–1658), chaplain to Charles I and later executed for treason as a Royalist
John Norris Hewett (c. 1745–1790), English art collector and amateur artist
John Short Hewett (1781–1835), English academic and priest
John William Hewett (1824–1886), English hymnist and antiquary
John Hewett (priest) (1830–1911), English priest, founder of All Saints', Babbacombe and father of below
John Hewett (MP) (1854-1941), English colonial administrator and Member of Parliament

See also
John Hewitt (disambiguation)
John Hewet (disambiguation)